Iliana Naidenova Ivanova (born in Stara Zagora, Bulgaria) is a Bulgarian public figure, an economist who has been serving as a member of the European Court of Auditors since 2013.

Early life and education
Ivanova graduated from foreign language high school "Romain Rolland" in her hometown where she studied French and English. In 1998 she graduated with a bachelor's degree in International Economic Relations from the Economic University in Varna. In 2004 Ivanova defended her master’s thesis in International Finance at the Thunderbird School of Global Management, Arizona.

Ivanova speaks Bulgarian, English, French, German and Russian.

Career
Ivanova worked as a coordinator for relations to international financial institutions at the Ministry of Agriculture, Food and Forestry.

From 2009 to 2012, Ivanova was a Member of the European Parliament. During her mandate, she served as Vice-chair of the Committee on Budgetary Control, Vice-chair of the Special Committee on the Economic, Financial and Social crisis, member of the Committee on the Internal Market and Consumer Protection and as substitute member of the Committee on Economic and Monetary Affairs. In addition to her committee assignments, she was one of the  vice-chairs of the parliament's delegation to China.
As of 31.12.2012 Ivanova has ceased all her political activities and affiliations.
Since 1 January 2013 Ivanova has been serving as a Member of the European Court of Auditors. On 21 September 2016 she was elected Dean of Chamber II, responsible for auditing structural policies, transport.

Other activities
Ivanova is a member of the International Honor Society Beta Gamma Sigma.

References

External links
 European Court of Auditors European Court of Auditors - Select your language

1975 births
21st-century Bulgarian economists
Bulgarian women economists
Women MEPs for Bulgaria
GERB MEPs
Living people
MEPs for Bulgaria 2009–2014
Politicians from Stara Zagora
21st-century Bulgarian women politicians
21st-century Bulgarian politicians